Kozhikode, or Calicut district, is one of the 14 districts in the Indian state of Kerala, along its Southwestern Malabar Coast. The city of Kozhikode, also known as Calicut, is the district headquarters. The district is 67.15% urbanised.

The Kozhikode Municipal Corporation has a corporation limit population of 609,224 and a metropolitan population of more than 2 million, making Kozhikode metropolitan area the second-largest in Kerala and the 19th largest in India. Kozhikode is classified as a Tier 2 city by the Government of India. NIT Calicut and IIM Kozhikode are two institutions of national importance located in the district.

Kozhikode is the largest city in the erstwhile Malabar District and acted as its headquarters during British Raj. In antiquity and the medieval period, Kozhikode was dubbed the City of Spices for its role as the major trading point for Indian spices. It was the capital of an independent kingdom ruled by the Samoothiris (Zamorins), which was also the largest kingdom in Kerala prior to the expansion of Travancore in the mid-18th century CE. The port at Kozhikode acted as the gateway to medieval South Indian coast for the Chinese, the Arabs, the Portuguese, the Dutch and finally the British.

Kozhikode district is bordered by the districts of Kannur and Mahé (Puducherry) to the north, Wayanad to the east, and Malappuram to the south. The Arabian Sea lies to the west and Western Ghats stretches towards east. Vavul Mala, a 2,339 m high peak situated on the trijunction of Kozhikode, Malappuram, and Wayanad districts, is the highest point of elevation in the district. It lies between latitudes 11° 08'N and 11° 50'N and longitudes 75° 30'E and 76° 8'E. The Thamarassery Churam connects the city of Kozhikode with the plateau of Wayanad.

The district is divided into four taluks: Kozhikode, Vatakara, Koyilandy and Thamarassery. By the 2011 census there are 12 block panchayats: Balusseri, Chelannur, Koduvally, Kozhikode, Kunnamangalam, Kunnummal, Melady, Panthalayani, Perambra, Thodannur, Thuneri and Vatakara. The Multidimensional Poverty Index report prepared by NITI Aayog based on the National Family Health Survey 2015–16 declared Kozhikode as the third-least poor  district in India, only after to Kottayam and Ernakulam, with a negligible multidimensional poverty rate of 0.26%.

History

Following the formation of Kerala in 1956, the erstwhile Malabar District was divided into three: Kannur district, Kozhikode district, and Palakkad district.

At that time, Kozhikode district had two Revenue Divisions: Kozhikode Revenue Division and Malappuram Revenue Division. Kozhikode Revenue Division had four Taluks: Vatakara, Koyilandy, Kozhikode, and South Wayanad. Malappuram Division had two Taluks: Eranad and Tirur. 

On 16 June 1969, Malappuram Revenue Division of Kozhikode district excluding three Revenue villages, Feroke, Ramanattukara, and Kadalundi, was separated to form Malappuram district.

Again on 1 November 1980, the South Wayanad Taluk of Kozhikode district was separated to form Wayanad district.

Demographics

(Details for 'Kozhikode Urban' retrieved from Census of India.)

According to the 2018 Statistics Report Kozhikode district has a population of 3,249,761, roughly equal to the nation of Mongolia or the US state of Iowa. 2011 Census of India gives the district a ranking of 115th in India (out of a total of 640). Its population growth rate over the decade 2001–2011 was 7.31%. Kozhikode has a sex ratio of 1097 females for every 1000 males, and a literacy rate of 95.24%. Scheduled Castes and Scheduled Tribes make up 6.45% and 0.49% of the population respectively.

The Kozhikode metropolitan area has a population of more than 2 million, making it the second-largest in Kerala and the 19th largest in India. 67.15% of the total population of Kozhikode district live in urban areas (which includes Municipal Corporations, Municipalities, and Census Towns), according to the 2011 Census of India. 

The Multidimensional Poverty Index report prepared by NITI Aayog based on the National Family Health Survey 2015–16 declared Kozhikode as the third-least poor  district in India, only after to Kottayam and Ernakulam, with a negligible multidimensional poverty rate of 0.26%.

Malayalam is the predominant language, spoken by 99.05% of the population. Small minorities speak Tamil and Hindi, mainly in urban areas. 

The centuries of trade across the Indian Ocean has given Kozhikode a cosmopolitan population.

Religion

According to the 2011 census, Hindus constitute the majority of the population, followed by the Muslims and the Christians. The proportion in the 2011 census was 56.21% Hindus; 39.24% Muslims and 4.26% Christians.

There is a small presence of Jains (601), Sikhs (297), and Buddhists (235).

Climate
The district has a generally humid climate with a very hot season extending from March to May. The rainy season is during the South West Monsoon, which sets in the first week of June and extends up to September. The North East Monsoon extends from the second half of October through November. The best weather is found in towards the end of the year, in December and January – the skies are clear, and the air is crisp. The lowest was  recorded on 26 December 1975.

Administration

The headquarters of the district administration is at Kozhikode Civil Station in West Hill. The district administration is headed by the District collector. He is assisted by some deputy collectors with responsibility for general matters, land acquisition, revenue recovery, land reforms, and elections.

Urban Local Bodies

There are 7 municipal towns in the district, in addition to the Kozhikode Municipal Corporation, which was established in 1962 as the second municipal corporation in Kerala after Trivandrum. They are:

Legislative representation

There are three Lok Sabha constituency in Kozhikode: Vatakara, Kozhikode, and Wayanad.

There are 13 Kerala Legislative Assembly seats in Kozhikode district.

Taluks

The district is divided into two revenue divisions which together incorporate four Taluks, each of which is headed by a Tehsildar, within them.

Taluks in the Vatakara Revenue Division are:

Taluks in the Kozhikode Revenue Division are:

Revenue villages
Kozhikode district is divided into 118 revenue villages for the ease and decentralisation of its revenue administration. They are further incorporated into 4 taluks as eludicated below.

Vatakara Taluk

 Ayanchery
 Azhiyur
 Chekkiad
 Chorode
 Edachery
 Eramala
 Kavilumpara
 Kayakody
 Kottappally
 Kunnummal
 Kuttiady
 Maniyoor
 Maruthonkara
 Nadakkuthazha
 Nadapuram
 Narippatta
 Onchiam
 Palayad
 Purameri
 Thinoor
 Thiruvallur
 Thuneri
 Vatakara
 Valayam
 Vanimel
 Velom
 Vilangad
 Villiappally

Koyilandy Taluk

 Arikkulam
 Atholy
 Avitanallur
 Balussery
 Chakkittapara
 Changaroth
 Chemanchery
 Chempanoda
 Chengottukavu
 Cheruvannur
 Eravattur
 Iringal
 Kayanna
 Keezhariyur
 Koorachundu
 Koothali
 Kottur
 Kozhukkallur
 Menhannyam
 Meppayur
 Moodadi
 Naduvannur
 Nochad
 Palery
 Panthalayany
 Payyoli
 Perambra
 Thikkody
 Thurayur
 Ulliyery
 Viyyur

Thamarassery Taluk

 Engapuzha
 Kanthalad
 Kattippara
 Kinalur
 Kizhakkoth
 Kodenchery
 Koduvally
 Kedavoor
 Koodaranji
 Koodathayi
 Narikkuni
 Nellipoyil
 Panangad
 Puthuppady
 Puthur
 Raroth
 Sivapuram
 Thiruvambady
 Unnikulam
 Vavad

Kozhikode Taluk

 Beypore
 Chathamangalam
 Chelannur
 Celavoor
 Cheruvannur
 Chevayoor
 Elathur
 Feroke
 Kacheri
 Kadalundi
 Kakkad
 Kakkodi
 Kakkur
 Karuvanthuruthy
 Kasaba
 Kodiyathur
  Kottooli
 Kumaranallur
 Kunnamangalam
 Kuruvattoor
  Kuttikkattoor
 Madavoor
 Mavoor
 Nagaram
 Nanmanda
 Neeleshwaram
 Nellikode
 Olavanna
 Panniyankara
 Pantheeramkavu
 Perumanna
 Peruvayal
 Poolakode
 Puthuyangadi
 Ramanattukara
 Thalakkulathur
 Thazhekode
 Valayanad
 Vengeri

Economy 

Kozhikode is one of the largest economic hubs in Kerala. Being home to about 8% of the state's population, the district contributes more than 12% to the state's income. Nedungadi Bank, the first and oldest bank in the modern state of Kerala, was established by Appu Nedungadi at Kozhikode in the year 1899. Cyberpark at Kozhikode is one of IT hubs in Kerala. The economy of Kozhikode significantly depends upon its Service sector.

Culture

Malayalam language
In the field of Malayalam language and literature, Kozhikode district has made many significant contributions. During the 17th century, His Highness Sri Samoothiri Manavedan Maharaja authored the famous Krishnattam, a Manipravalam text describing the childhood of Lord Krishna in eight volumes. The district is famous for folk songs or ballads known as Vadakkan Pattukal. The most popular songs celebrate the exploits of Thacholi Othenan and Unniyarcha. An intellectual debate for Vedic scholars, where winners receive the title of Pattathanam, takes place at Thali temple during the month of Thulam. Kozhikode also has a strong associations with ghazals and football.

Malayalam Literature

Many prominent writers of Malayalam literature hail from Kozhikode. Among them are S. K. Pottekkatt, Thikkodiyan, Punathil Kunjabdulla, U. A. Khader, Akbar Kakkattil, N. N. Kakkad, P. Valsala and M. N. Karassery. S. K. Pottekkatt was perhaps the most celebrated writer from Kozhikode whose award-winning work Oru Theruvinte Katha is set in S. M. Street. Several leading Malayalam publishing houses are based in the city, including Poorna, Mathrubhumi, Mulberry, Lipi and Olive. Several libraries are located in and around the city. The Kozhikode Public Library and Research Centre at Mananchira was constructed in 1996.

Music
In addition to the Malabar Mahotsavam, the annual cultural fest of Kozhikode, every year since 1981 the Tyagaraja Aradhana Trust has been conducting a five-day music festival in honour of Tyagaraja. The festival is complete with the Uncchavritti, rendering of Divyanama kritis, Pancharatna Kritis, concerts by professional artistes and students of music from morning to late in the evening.

Kozhikode has a tradition of Ghazal and Hindustani music appreciation. There are many Malayalam Ghazals. The late film director and play back singer M. S. Baburaj, from Kozhikode was influenced by Ghazal and Hindustani.

There are DJ parties and events that are held in hotels and malls and pubs and IT parks in Calicut. Ragam  and Thatva fest in NITC and different fests in IIM gets participation of international bands.

Cuisine

Kozhikode offers a variety of South Indian, North Indian, European, Chinese, Arab, Gujarati and Jain food. The culinary culture of the city has been moulded by Portuguese, Dutch, French, British, Arab and other Indian influence. It offers both veg and non veg dishes in great variety. The mall culture in the city has gained momentum and fast foods are very popular. The new generation is more inclined to Chinese,Arab and American food culture and a new trend of vegetarianism is getting popular because of health concerns.
The city is also famous for Haluva called as Sweet Meat by Europeans due to the texture of the sweet. Kozhikode has a main road in the town named S. M. Street (Mittayi Theruvu). It derived this name from the numerous Halwa stores which used to dot the street. The history of this Street dates back to time of the Zamorin of Calicut, when the ruler invited Gujarati sweetmeat makers to set up shop in the city and accommodated their shops just outside the palace walls. Another speciality is banana chips,  which are made crisp and wafer-thin. Other popular dishes include seafood preparations (prawns, mussels, mackerel) . Vegetarian fare includes the sadya.

Films
The film history of Kozhikode dates back to 1950s. Some of the main production companies of Malayalam films like Grihalakshmi productions, Kalpaka, Swargachithra, etc. are Kozhikode based companies. The city was also an important hub of top notch film makers like I. V. Sasi and T. Damodaran. Kozhikode produced such notable actors as Ummer, Mammukoya, Balan K. Nair, Santha Devi and Kuthiravattam Pappu. The ever green musician Baburaj, Gireesh Puthenchery, arguably one of the best lyricists in the Malayalam film industry, director, script writer and actor Ranjith, V. M. Vinu, A. Vincent, Shajoon Kariyal, Anjali Menon and cinematographer P. S. Nivas also hail from Kozhikode. Some of the other cine actors like Neeraj Madhav, Madhupal, Anoop Menon, Nellikode Bhaskaran, Augustine and Vijayan Malaparamba are from Kozhikode.

The 1947 Douglas Fairbanks Jr. Hollywood thriller, Sinbad the Sailor, mentions Kozhikode.

Kozhikode, the largest city in the Malabar region, also has a vital role in the entertainment segment. The city's first theatre, Calicut Crown, was opened as early as 1925. The city has more than 10 theatres and two multiplexes, the PVS Film City (the first multiplex in Malabar region) and Crown Theatre.

Sports

Kozhikode is known as the second Mecca of football (after Kolkata). The other most popular games in Kozhikode are cricket, football, basketball, badminton and volleyball. The E. M. S Stadium hosted many international football matches of major football teams in the past. The city is home to many international footballers. One of the famous was Olympian Abdurahman who played for the nation in many international games including Melbourne Olympic games. K.P. Sethu Madhavan, Premnath Phillips, Muhamad Najeeb, M Prasannan, Sudheer etc. are some international footballers from Kozhikode. The seven-a-side form of football is also very famous in the city.
P. T. Usha, is a famous athlete who is regarded as one of the greatest athletes India has ever produced and is often called the "queen of Indian track and field". She is nicknamed Payyoli Express. Currently she runs the Usha School of Athletics at Koyilandy in Kerala.
T. Abdul Rahman, popularly known as Olympian Rahman, was an Indian Olympian footballer from Kozhikode. Rahman was a member of the Indian team that reached the semi-final in 1956 Melbourne Olympics.
Other sports personalities include Jimmy George, Tom Joseph (Indian volleyball player and was captain of Indian volleyball team) and Premnath Phillips.
Jaseel P. Ismail, V. Diju, Aparna Balan & Arun Vishnu are international badminton players from the city.
The Sports & Education Promotion Trust (SEPT) was established to promote sports development in India with focus on football. Started in 2004 and based in Kozhikode, the trust has set up 52 centres called "football nurseries" spread across thirteen districts in Kerala. Since 2010, Calicut Mini Marathon runs have been organised by IIM Kozhikode and witness participation of around 7000 people every year.

Print Media

Kozhikode occupies a prominent position in the history of Malayalam journalism. The origin of journalism in the district can be traced back to 1880. The Kerala Pathrika is likely the earliest newspaper published from Kozhikode. Keralam, Kerala Sanchari and Bharath Vilasam are among the other newspapers that were published from Kozhikode pre-1893.

Kozhikode is the 'birthplace' of the widely circulated Malayalam dailies Mathrubhumi, Desabhimani and Madhyamam. Chandrika, Thejas, Siraj, Varthamanam and Calicut Times are the other dailies from Kozhikode. Along with those papers, noted dailies like Malayala Manorama, Kerala Kaumudi, Mangalam, Deepika, The Times Of India, New Indian Express, The Hindu, Deccan chronicle, Janmabhumi, Veekshanam and evening dailies like Pradeepam, Rashtra deepika, News Kerala and Flash are published from Kozhikode. Nearly all news agencies, other major newspapers published from outside the state are represented in Kozhikode. The Times of India, the largest-circulating English broadsheet newspaper in the world, started circulation in Kozhikode on 1 February 2012. A large number of weeklies, fortnightlies and monthlies are also published there (such as Information Technology Lokam, a computer magazine in Malayalam). Newspapers in other regional languages like English, Hindi, Kannada, Tamil and Telugu are available.

Radio
The Kozhikode radio station of All India Radio has two transmitters: Kozhikode AM (100 kilowatt) and Kozhikode FM [Vividh Bharathi] (10 kilowatt). Private FM radio stations: Radio Mango 91.9 operated by Malayala Manorama Co. Ltd.
and Red FM 93.5 of the SUN Network. AIR FM radio station: Kozhikode – 103.6 MHz; AIR MW radio station: Kozhikode – 684 kHz.

Television

A television transmitter has been functioning in Kozhikode since 3 July 1984, relaying programmes from Delhi and Thiruvananthapuram Doordarshan. Doordarshan has its broadcasting centre in Kozhikode located at Medical College. The Malayalam channels based on Kozhikode are the Shalom Television,  Darshana TV and Media One TV. All major channels in Malayalam viz. Manorama News, Asianet, Surya TV, Kairali TV, Amrita TV, Jeevan TV, Indiavision and Jaihind have their studios and news bureaus in the city. Satellite television services are available through DD Direct+, Dish TV, Sun Direct DTH and Tata Sky. Asianet Cable Vision popularly known as ACV telecasts daily city news. Spidernet is another local channel. Other local operators include KCL and Citinet.

The Calicut Press Club came into existence in 1970. It is the nerve centre of all media activities, both print and electronic. Began with around 70 members in the roll, this Press Club, over the years, became a prestigious and alert media centre in the state with a present membership of over 280.

Transport

Air

The airport started operation in April 1988. It has two terminals, one for domestic flights and second for international flights.

Road
Kozhikode is well connected by road. NH 66 and NH 766 connects Calicut to rest of India. It has bus services to all parts of Kerala, Karnataka, Tamil Nadu and to important cities like Hyderabad and Mumbai.

Notable people

See also
 Chittaripilakkal
 Kozhikode
 Malabar
 Zamorin

References

Further reading

External links 

 Kozhikode District official website

 
Districts of Kerala
Populated places established in 1957
1957 establishments in Kerala